Prostitute is the fourth studio album by German synth-pop band Alphaville.

Overview
Following "the sci-fi-themed Afternoons in Utopia and the lushly orchestrated The Breathtaking Blue", it was Alphaville's first release for five years. Having "a great variety of styles", this "jazzy and EDM-influenced" "dark theatrical album proved too abstract to achieve any notoriety". "The lack of commercial success led the band to return to its synth/dance roots with the following album, Salvation".

In 2019 Marian Gold recommended Prostitute, along with the 2017 Strange Attractor, to anyone who only knew Alphaville from Big In Japan.

It is the last Alphaville album with Ricky Echolette.

Track listing

References

1994 albums
Alphaville (band) albums